Not Music is the tenth studio album by English-French rock band Stereolab, released on 16 November 2010 by Drag City and Duophonic Records. The album is a collection of unreleased material recorded at the same time as their previous album Chemical Chords (2008).

Background
Most of the songs on Not Music were recorded during the same sessions as Stereolab's previous album Chemical Chords. The album also contains remixed versions of "Silver Sands" and "Neon Beanbag", two songs that previously appeared on Chemical Chords.

Not Music was released by Drag City and Stereolab's self-operated label Duophonic Records on 16 November 2010, during the band's indefinite hiatus following the 2008 release of Chemical Chords.

Critical reception

Not Music received generally positive reviews from critics. On the review aggregate website Metacritic, the album has a score of 70 out of 100, indicating "Generally favorable reviews".

Arnold Pan of PopMatters found that "the catchiest tracks on Not Music make a good soundtrack for strolling down memory lane, with Stereolab offering fresh takes on old triumphs, rather than just reliving them." Rebecca Raber of Pitchfork was also positive, writing, "I suspect it won't be long before we realize that the leftovers of a band like Stereolab are still better than main dishes offered up by many of their peers." AllMusic critic Heather Phares described Not Music as being "all over the place in the best possible way", noting that it would especially appeal to listeners interested in "Stereolab's gracefully intellectual side". The A.V. Clubs Christian Williams said that while the record felt padded near the end, "[f]or reheated leftovers... Not Music is delicious."

In a mixed review, Jon Falcone of Drowned in Sound wrote, "Stereolab will always provide excitement, but in the past, part of that excitement came from a band having no idea of how they should sound, so that the result threw polemics and tangents together with an unmatched grace. Now it feels as though they're comfortable in their skin. This is great for them, but for the listener it's a bitter sweet comfort and feels akin to insincerely wishing well to an ex who has happily moved on." Under the Radar writer Hays Davis was more critical, describing Not Music as "one of those albums of extras that disappointingly lays bare why these tracks were excluded from those that initially found a release."

Track listing

Personnel
Credits are adapted from the album's liner notes.

Stereolab
 Tim Gane – guitar
 Lætitia Sadier – vocals
 Simon Johns – bass
 Andy Ramsay – drums, VCS 3 synthesizer
 Joe Watson – Moog synthesizer, Farfisa organ

Additional musicians
 Sean O'Hagan – brass arrangements on "Supah Jaianto"
 Joe Walters – French horn

Production
 Atlas Sound – remixing on "Neon Beanbag" (Atlas Sound mix)
 The Emperor Machine – remixing on "Silver Sands" (Emperor Machine mix)
 Bo Kondren (credited as "Bo") – mastering
 Stereolab (credited as "The Groop") – mixing
 Joe Watson – engineering, mixing

Design
 Vee – sleeve design

Charts

References

External links
 
 

2010 albums
Stereolab albums
Drag City (record label) albums